Gasterellaceae is a family of fungi in the order Boletales. It contains the single genus Gasterella, which in turn contains the single species Gasterella luteophila, found in the USA. The genus and species was described by American mycologists Sanford Myron Zeller and Leva Belle Walker in 1935; the family by Zeller in 1948.

References

Boletales
Fungi of North America
Monotypic Boletales genera